James ("Jimmy") Grashow (born January 16, 1942) is an American sculptor and woodcut artist. He is perhaps best known for his sculptures and large-scale installations (such as cities, fountains, and menageries) made of cardboard.

Grashow was born in Brooklyn, New York and received his BFA (1963) and MFA (1965) degrees from Pratt Institute. He then received a Fulbright Travel Grant to study in Florence. Based in Redding, Connecticut, his works have been exhibited at many museums including the DeCordova Museum and Sculpture Park in Lincoln, Massachusetts; the Art Complex Museum in Duxbury, Massachusetts; the Center for the Arts at SUNY Purchase
the Taubman Museum of Art in Roanoke, Virginia and the Aldrich Contemporary Art Museum in Ridgefield, Connecticut.

Grashow also created cover art for record albums such as Jethro Tull's 1969 album Stand Up and the 1971 Yardbirds album Live Yardbirds: Featuring Jimmy Page.

He is the subject of a 2012 documentary entitled The Cardboard Bernini, describing the creation, exhibition, anticipated decay, and ultimate destruction of an enormous cardboard fountain, inspired by the Trevi Fountain in Rome and the work of Gian Lorenzo Bernini.

References

External links
Official website

Artists from Connecticut
People from Brooklyn
Pratt Institute alumni
1942 births
Living people
People from Redding, Connecticut